William Rossa Cole (November 20, 1919 – August 2, 2000) was an American editor, anthologist, columnist, author, and writer of light verse.  He produced around 75 books, most of them anthologies.

Cole was born William Harrison Cole on November 20, 1919 to William Harrison Cole and Margaret O'Donovan-Rossa of Staten Island, New York. He was the brother of Rossa Cole.  His grandfather was the Irish Fenian leader Jeremiah O'Donovan Rossa.

Cole worked in a deli and a bookstore in the 1930s. After military service in the infantry in World War II from 1940 to 1945 (during which he earned a Purple Heart), he took various jobs in the publishing industry, serving as publicity director at Alfred A. Knopf from 1946 to 1958, publicity director and editor at Simon & Schuster from 1958 to 1961, and, with Viking Press, co-publisher of William Cole Books.

He was also a prolific writer and anthologist, editing and writing over 75 books. Many of his books were honored by the American Library Association, including I Went to the Animal Fair: A Book of Animal Poems (named a notable book of 1958, and on the List of Notable Children's Books of 1940–1959), Beastly Boys and Ghastly Girls: Poems (named a notable book of 1964), and The Birds and Beasts Were There: Animal Poems (honored in 1965).

Cole's whimsical poetry often appeared in Light Quarterly and was widely anthologized, as in The Oxford Book of American Light Verse and various collections by Willard R. Espy.

Reviewing eleven collections of poetry for children, Selden Rodman (aided by his own three children) found Cole's Oh, How Silly! and Jack Prelutsky's Toucans Two the only two among them that were "literate and consistently readable". The former was a "really masterful collaboration" by Cole and its illustrator, Tomi Ungerer.

Cole wrote the regular column "Trade Winds" in Saturday Review from 1974 to 1979; a book review column for Endless Vacation, from around 1990 to 2000; and contributed to Atlantic Monthly, Harper's, The New York Times Book Review, and The New Yorker.

Cole died in his Manhattan home, aged 80, on August 2, 2000. He was memorialized in a poem by Seamus Heaney, winner of the Nobel Prize in Literature.

Cole was married twice: to Peggy Bennett in 1947 and to Galen Williams in 1967. Both marriages ended in divorce. He was survived by two daughters and two sons.

Bibliography
Second and later editions are listed only if retitled.
William Cole, ed. The Fireside Book of Humorous Poetry. New York: Simon & Schuster, 1950. .
Marvin Rosenberg and William Cole, eds. The Best Cartoons from "Punch": Collected for Americans from England's Famous Humorous Weekly. New York: Simon & Schuster, 1952. .
William Cole and Bruce Rogers, eds. The Best Humor from "Punch", illustrated by Sprod. Cleveland: World Publishing, 1953. . (British edition: The Best Humour from "Punch".)
Marvin Rosenberg and William Cole, eds. America Laughs at "Punch": Collected by Americans – for Americans from England's Famous Humorous Weekly. London: Thames & Hudson, 1953. .
William Cole and Douglas McKee, eds. French Cartoons: Riotous, Ribald, and Racy. New York: Dell, 1955. .
William Cole, ed. Humorous Poetry for Children, illustrated by Ervine Metzl. Cleveland, Ohio: World Publishing, 1955. .
William Cole and Douglas McKee, eds. More French Cartoons. New York: Dell, 1955. .
William Cole and Florett Robinson, eds. Women Are Wonderful! A History in Cartoons of a Hundred Years with America's Most Controversial Figure. Boston: Houghton Mifflin, 1956. .
William Cole, ed. Story Poems, New and Old, illustrated by Walter Buehr. Cleveland, Ohio: World Publishing, 1957. .
William Cole, ed. I Went to the Animal Fair: A Book of Animal Poems, illustrated by Colette Rosselli. Cleveland, Ohio: World Publishing, 1958. .
William Cole, ed. Poems of Magic and Spells, illustrated by Peggy Bacon. Cleveland, Ohio: World Publishing, 1960. .
William Cole and Julia Colmore, eds. The Poetry-Drawing Book. New York: Simon & Schuster, 1960. .
William Cole, ed. Folk Songs of England, Ireland, Scotland, and Wales, arranged by Norman Monath and illustrated by Edward Ardizzone. Garden City, New York: Doubleday, 1961. .
William Cole and Julia Colmore, eds. New York in Photographs. New York: Simon & Schuster, 1961. .
William Cole, ed. Poems for Seasons and Celebrations, illustrated by Johannes Troyer. Cleveland, Ohio: World Publishing, 1961. .
William Cole and Douglas McKee, eds. Touché: French Cartoons. New York: Dell, 1961. .
William Cole and Julia Colmore, eds. The Second Poetry-Drawing Book. New York: Simon & Schuster, 1962. .
William Cole and Douglas McKee, eds. You Damn Men Are All Alike: French Cartoons. Greenwich, Connecticut: Fawcett, 1962. .
William Cole, ed. The Birds and the Beasts Were There: Animal Poems, illustrated by Helen Siegl. Cleveland, Ohio: World Publishing, 1963. .
William Cole, ed. A Cat-Hater's Handbook; or, The Ailurophobe's Delight, illustrated by Tomi Ungerer. Dial, 1963. . London: W.H. Allen, 1963. .
William Cole, ed. Erotic Poetry: The Lyrics, Ballads, Idyls, and Epics of Love, Classical to Contemporary, illustrated by Warren Chappell. Foreword by Stephen Spender. New York: Random House, 1963. .
William Cole. Frances Face-Maker: A Going-to-Bed Book, illustrated by Tomi Ungerer, World Publishing, 1963. .
William Cole, ed. The Most of A. J. Liebling. New York: Simon & Schuster, 1963. .
William Cole, ed. Beastly Boys and Ghastly Girls, illustrated by Tomi Ungerer. Cleveland, Ohio: World Publishing, 1964. .
William Cole, ed. A Big Bowl of "Punch": A Heady Potpourri of Cartoons, Prose, and Verse from England's Famous Humorous Weekly. New York: Simon & Schuster, 1964. .
William Cole, ed. A Book of Love Poems, illustrated by Lars Bo. Viking, 1965. .
William Cole. What's Good for a Six-Year-Old?, illustrated by Ingrid Fetz. Holt, Rinehart and Winston, 1965. .
William Cole, ed. Oh, What Nonsense!, illustrated by Tomi Ungerer. New York: Viking, 1966. .
William Cole. Uncoupled Couplets: A Game of Rhymes. New York: Taplinger, 1966. .
William Cole and Mike Thaler, eds. The Classic Cartoons. Cleveland, Ohio: World Publishing, 1966. .
William Cole. What's Good for a Four-Year-Old?, illustrated by Tomi Ungerer. Holt, Rinehart and Winston, 1967. .
William Cole, ed. Limerick Giggles, Joke Giggles, illustrated by Tomi Ungerer. Cleveland, Ohio: World Publishing, 1967. . (A Case of the Giggles, vol. 1.)
William Cole, ed. Rhyme Giggles, Nonsense Giggles, illustrated by Tomi Ungerer. Cleveland, Ohio: World Publishing, 1967. . (A Case of the Giggles, vol. 2.)
William Cole, ed. Eight Lines and Under: An Anthology of Short, Short Poems. New York: Macmillan, 1967. .
William Cole, ed. W. S. Gilbert, Poems, illustrated by W. S. Gilbert. New York: Crowell, 1967. .
William Cole, ed. Poems Selected for Young People, by D. H. Lawrence, illustrated by Ellen Raskin. New York: Viking, 1967. .
William Cole, ed. Man's Funniest Friend: The Dog in Stories, Reminiscences, Poems and Cartoons. Cleveland, Ohio: World Publishing, 1967. .
William Cole, ed. The Sea, Ships, and Sailors: Poems, Songs, and Shanties, illustrated by Robin Jacques. New York: Viking, 1967. .
William Cole, ed. Poems of Thomas Hood, illustrated by Sam Fischer. New York: Crowell, 1968. .
William Cole, ed. A Book of Nature Poems, illustrated by Robert Andrew Parker. New York: Viking, 1969. .
William Cole, ed. Pith and Vinegar: An Anthology of Short Humorous Poetry. New York: Simon & Schuster, 1969. .
William Cole, ed. The Punch Line: Presenting Today's Top Twenty-five Cartoon Artists from England's Famous Humor Magazine. New York: Simon & Schuster, 1969. .
William Cole, ed. Rough Men, Tough Men: Poems of Action and Adventure, illustrated by Enrico Arno. New York: Viking, 1969. .
William Cole, ed. What's Good for a Five-Year-Old?, illustrated by Edward Sorel. New York: Holt, Rinehart & Winston, 1969. .
William Cole. Aunt Bella's Umbrella, illustrated by Jacqueline Chwast. New York: Doubleday, 1970. .
William Cole, ed. The Book of Giggles, illustrated by Tomi Ungerer. New York: World Publishing, 1970. .
William Cole, ed. Oh, How Silly! Poems, illustrated by Tomi Ungerer. New York: Viking, 1970. .
William Cole. That Pest, Jonathan, illustrated by Tomi Ungerer. New York: Harper & Row, 1970. .
William Cole, ed. The Poet's Tales: A New Book of Story Poems, illustrated by Charles Keeping. New York: World Publishing, 1971. .
William Cole, ed. Poetry Brief: An Anthology of Short, Short Poems. New York: Macmillan, 1971. .
William Cole, ed. ... And Be Merry! A Feast of Light Verse and a Soupçon of Prose about the Joy of Eating. New York: Grossman, 1972. .
William Cole, ed. Oh, That's Ridiculous! Poems, illustrated by Tomi Ungerer. New York: Viking, 1972. .
William Cole, ed. Pick Me Up: A Book of Short, Short Poems. New York: Macmillan, 1972. .
William Cole, ed. Poems from Ireland, illustrated by William Stobbs. New York: Crowell, 1972. .
William Cole, ed. A Book of Animal Poems, illustrated by Robert Andrew Parker. New York: Viking, 1973. .
William Cole, ed. Half Serious: An Anthology of Short, Short Poems. London: Eyre Methuen, 1973. .
William Cole, ed. Poems: One Line and Longer. New York: Grossman, 1973. .
William Cole. What's Good for a Three-Year-Old?, illustrated by Lillian Hoban. New York: Holt, Rinehart and Winston, 1974. .
William Cole. Knock Knocks: The Most Ever, illustrated by Mike Thaler. New York: F. Watts, 1976. , .
William Cole. The Square Bear and Other Riddle Rhymers. New York: Scholastic, 1976. .
William Cole, ed. A Boy Named Mary Jane, and Other Silly Verse, illustrated by George MacClain. New York: F. Watts, 1977. , .
William Cole. Knock Knocks You've Never Heard Before, illustrated by Mike Thaler, New York: F. Watts, 1977. .
William Cole, ed. An Arkful of Animals, illustrated by Lynn Munsinger. Boston: Houghton Mifflin, 1978. , .
William Cole. Give Up? Cartoon Riddle Rhymers, illustrated by Mike Thaler, New York: F. Watts, 1978. .
William Cole, ed. I'm Mad at You!, illustrated by George MacClain. New York: Collins, 1978. , .
William Cole, ed. Oh, Such Foolishness!, illustrated by Tomie dePaola, Philadelphia: Lippincott, 1978. .
William Cole, ed. Backwords, illustrated by Mike Thaler. New York: Random House, 1980. .
William Cole. Dinosaurs and Beasts of Yore: Poems, illustrated by Susanna Natti. Cleveland, Ohio: Collins, 1979. , .
William Cole, ed. The Poetry of Horses, illustrated by Ruth Sanderson. New York: Scribner, 1979. .
William Cole, ed. Good Dog Poems, illustrated by Ruth Sanderson. New York: Scribner, 1981. .
William Cole, ed. New Knock Knocks, illustrated by Mike Thaler. London: Granada, 1981. .
William Cole, ed. Poem Stew, illustrated by Karen Ann Weinhaus. New York: Lippincott, 1981.
William Cole, ed. Monster Knock Knocks, illustrated by Mike Thaler. Pocket Books, 1982.
William Cole and Louis Phillips, eds. Sex: "The Most Fun You Can Have without Laughing" ... and Other Quotations. New York: St. Martin's, 1990. .
William Cole, ed. A Zooful of Animals, illustrated by Lynn Munsinger. Boston: Houghton Mifflin, 1992. , .
William Cole, ed. Bah Humbug!: Grumping through the Season. New York: St. Martin's, 1992. .
William Cole and Louis Phillips, eds. Oh, What an Awful Thing to Say!: Needles, Skewers, Pricks, and Outright Nastiness. New York: St. Martin's, 1992. .
William Cole and Louis Phillips, eds. The Bedside Book of Insults. London: John Murray, 1992. . (British edition of Oh, What an Awful Thing to Say!)
William Cole, ed. New York: A Literary Companion. Wainscott, New York: Pushcart, 1992. .
William Cole, ed. Have I Got Dogs!, illustrated by Margot Apple. New York: Viking, 1993. .

Notes

References

External links

 

1919 births
2000 deaths
American book editors
American humorists
American humorous poets
Anthologists
Children's poets
O'Donovan family
Poets from New York (state)
20th-century American poets
20th-century American male writers
Writers from Manhattan
Writers from Staten Island